Freetown International Airport  (officially), locally known as Lungi International Airport, is an international airport located in the coastal town of Lungi, Sierra Leone. It is the only international airport in Sierra Leone. The Sierra Leone River separates the airport from Freetown, the nation's capital city.

The airport is operated by the Sierra Leone Airports Authority. Prior to its use as a civilian airport, it was a British Royal Air Force base. In 2012 its management was contracted out to the British security and military company Westminster Aviation Security Services Ltd.

A new international airport was planned at Mamamah to replace Lungi International Airport. Mamamah International Airport was expected to be operational by 2022, however the project was cancelled in October 2018 following a change of government. The government Aviation Minister stated that they would refurbish Lungi instead and may build a bridge to better link the airport to Freetown. The Lungi Bridge project was announced by the president during 2019.

Following parliamentary approval in December 2020, a $270 million expansion project started.  The project includes a new passenger terminal, VIP terminal, taxiways and widening of the runway.  The annual capacity will be 1 million passengers and will be capable of handling 8 wide-body aircraft at any one time.  The new terminal is located on the northern side of the runway, towards the eastern end.  The new terminal was officially opened on the 4th March 2023.  A management agreement has been signed with Summa Airport (SL) Ltd.

Facilities

The terminal building of the airport is composed of three distinct zones: a General Waiting Hall, a Departures Wing, and an Arrivals Wing. The General Waiting Hall provides ticketing desks for local transportation (coach, ferry, fast boat and taxi), postal services, a travel agency office, and a restaurant. The Departures Wing contains duty-free shops, restaurants and lounges for business class passengers and VIPs. The Arrivals wing has a customs hall with a money exchange offices, shop, a lost and found baggage office, and an information office. The airport grounds also contain two banks, a police center, various restaurants, two car parks, and a mosque.

The government of Sierra Leone undertook a general upgrade of the terminal in 2010, in order to meet the basic standards of current international airports. The departure hall was commissioned in February 2013. The arrival hall was commissioned in May 2014.

From September 2014, almost all regional and intercontinental flights to Freetown were suspended as a result of the 2014 West Africa Ebola virus outbreak. During this crisis, Brussels Airlines was the only carrier to maintain its regular operations to the airport; catering almost exclusively to NGO health workers. The first airline to resume commercial flights after suspending them was Air Cote d'Ivoire in October 2014 while Air France announced it would resume services by June 2015. British Airways chose not to resume flights to Sierra Leone.  A national airline Fly Salone operated briefly at the start of 2016. This was the first national airline to operate for more than 10 years after Sierra National Airlines stopped flying.  After last having served Freetown in December 1996, KLM restarted flights in March 2017, but discontinued them in 2019. ASKY Airlines recommenced flights in November 2017.

Access
Because the Lungi International Airport is across an estuary from the capital Freetown, passengers have the options of traveling from Freetown International Airport to Freetown through government ferry, private passenger water taxi speed boats and bus transportation. The water taxis are large boats, often with air conditioning and wifi.  Most people who are traveling outside Freetown, and to other parts of Sierra Leone, use the highway through public or private transportation. The ferry is the cheapest, and the most common way of traveling from Lungi to Freetown for most Sierra Leoneans. The ferry takes about an hour by sea from Lungi to Freetown. The private water taxis take 30–40 minutes to Aberdeen, Murray Town or Government wharf.

Public and private transportation buses run from Lungi to Freetown, and to other parts of Sierra Leone. The highway road journey from Lungi to Freetown is generally three hours drive, but can be considerably more because of traffic in Freetown.

Airlines and destinations

Accidents and incidents

 On 11 August 2004 at around 2:30 p.m. a Boeing 737-200 operated by Air Guinee Express crashed while failing to take off at Lungi Airport.  There were no fatalities among the 127 passengers and crew members.
 On 3 June 2007 a helicopter flight from Freetown exploded and crashed on landing at Lungi airport, killing all 22 people on board. The helicopter, a Russian Mi-8, was operated by Paramount Airlines, which shuttled passengers between Sierra Leone's coastal capital Freetown and Lungi airport.
 On 30 April 2017 a Brussels Airlines Airbus A330 landed at Lungi Airport after having lost a fairing at the wing root upon departure from Brussels. The aircraft was grounded for 48 hours to investigate and the Belgian Accident Investigation Board rated this as a "serious incident".

References

External links

A-Z World Airports

Airport
Airports in Sierra Leone
Transport infrastructure in Sierra Leone